Wagmatcook First Nation is a band of Mi'kmaq people in Cape Breton Island, Nova Scotia. 
As of 2016, the registered population is 537. It includes the Margaree 25 reserve.

See also
List of Indian Reserves in Nova Scotia

References

Indian reserves in Nova Scotia
Communities in Inverness County, Nova Scotia
First Nations governments in Atlantic Canada
First Nations in Nova Scotia
Mi'kmaq governments
Communities in Victoria County, Nova Scotia